The National Palace is a building in Santo Domingo, that houses the offices of the Executive Branch (Presidency and Vice Presidency) of the Dominican Republic.

History 
Designed in a restrained neoclassical style by Italian architect Guido D'Alessandro at the behest of Rafael Trujillo, construction started on February 27, 1944 —The centenary of Dominican independence —and was inaugurated on August 16, 1947. Occupying an area of 18,000 square metres and luxuriously appointed throughout, the National Palace is considered one of the most beautiful buildings built in the Dominican Republic.  

The building stands on the grounds of the former Presidential Mansion (Mansión Presidencial), built during the United States occupation of the Dominican Republic (1916–1924)

Design 
While the president's office is located within the palace, the Palacio Nacional is not an executive residence as the president does not live there; there is no designated Executive Residence in Santo Domingo. The building comprises three stories. Building services are located at ground level. 

The main floor includes the ceremonial vestibule, the Presidential and Vice-presidential offices, and the Cabinet meeting room. The third storey houses the main reception rooms: the Hall of the Ambassadors, the Hall of the Caryatids, the Green Room, the Mahogany room, and the president's private quarters.

The dome, which rests on a windowed drum, is 34 metres high and has a diameter of 18 m. Inside, 18 columns sustain the dome. Most of the marble used throughout the building is Dominican, and was extracted from quarries in Samaná and Caballero. The Palacio Nacional complex also includes the "presidential" Chapel of San Rafael Arcángel, carried out in the same architectural style as the palace.

In popular culture 
The Palace and mainly the Hall of the Caryatids was used for the new year's scene in The Godfather Part II where Michael confronts Fredo about his betrayal.

References

External links

 Tour of the National Palace (in Spanish): https://web.archive.org/web/20090829232216/http://www.presidencia.gob.do/app/galeria.aspx

Buildings and structures in Santo Domingo
Government of the Dominican Republic
Palaces in the Dominican Republic
Neoclassical architecture
Tourist attractions in Santo Domingo
Government buildings completed in 1947